Gobiobotia abbreviata is a species of small freshwater fish in the family Cyprinidae. It is found in the upper drainages of the Yangtze in China.

References

 

Gobiobotia
Fish described in 1931